Elena Petrovska (born 13 March 1998) is a Macedonian footballer who plays as a midfielder for 1. liga club ŽFK Skopje 2014 and the North Macedonia women's national team.

Club career
Petrovska has played for Istatov and Dragon in North Macedonia at the UEFA Women's Champions League.

International career
Petrovska capped for North Macedonia at senior level during the UEFA Women's Euro 2022 qualifying.

References

1998 births
Living people
Macedonian women's footballers
Women's association football midfielders
North Macedonia women's international footballers
ŽFK Dragon 2014 players